Buprenorphine/naltrexone is an experimental combination drug formulation of buprenorphine, a μ-opioid receptor (MOR) weak partial agonist and κ-opioid receptor (KOR) antagonist, and naltrexone, a MOR and KOR silent antagonist, which is under investigation for the potential treatment of psychiatric disorders. The combination of the two drugs is thought to result in a selective blockade of the KOR and hence fewer MOR activation-related concerns such as euphoria and opioid dependence. It has been found to produce antidepressant-like effects in mice (similarly to the case of buprenorphine alone or in combination with samidorphan) and (at a buprenorphine dosage of 16 mg/day but not 4 mg/day) has recently been found to be effective in the treatment of cocaine dependence in a large clinical trial.

See also 
 Buprenorphine/samidorphan
 Buprenorphine/naloxone

References 

Combination drugs
Drug rehabilitation
4,5-Epoxymorphinans
Kappa-opioid receptor antagonists
Mu-opioid receptor antagonists
Oripavines
Semisynthetic opioids